Leandro Barcia Montero (born 8 October 1992 in Florida, Uruguay) is a Uruguayan footballer who currently plays for Campeonato Brasileiro Série A club Ponte Preta. He previously played for Campeonato Brasileiro Série A clubs Goiás and Sport Recife, in addition to Uruguayan Primera División club Nacional.

Career

Goiás (loan) 
On 15 January 2019 Goiás signed Barcia on a one-year deal.

Sport Recife (loan) 
On 2 January 2020 signed with another Brazilian club Sport Recife, recently promoted to the Campeonato Brasileiro Série A.

Atlético Goianiense (loan) 
on 4 January 2022 Atlético Goianiense signed Barcia from Rentistas on a one year loan deal until 31 December 2022.

Career statistics

Honours
Nacional
Uruguayan Primera División: 2014–15, 2016

 Atlético Goianiense
Campeonato Goiano: 2022

References

External links
 

1992 births
Living people
People from Florida Department
Uruguayan footballers
Club Nacional de Football players
Goiás Esporte Clube players
Sport Club do Recife players
Atlético Clube Goianiense players
Associação Atlética Ponte Preta players
Campeonato Brasileiro Série A players
Campeonato Brasileiro Série B players
Uruguayan Primera División players
Expatriate footballers in Brazil
Uruguayan expatriate footballers
Uruguayan expatriate sportspeople in Brazil
Association football forwards